Heinz Kloss (30 October 1904, in Halle, Saxony-Anhalt – 13 June 1987) was a German linguist and internationally recognised authority on linguistic minorities.

He coined the terms "Abstandsprache" and "Ausbausprache" to try to describe the differences between what is commonly called a dialect and what is commonly called a language.

Kloss was also responsible for summing up previously publicly available statistical data on the North American Jewish population (without any stated political aim); one copy was found in Hitler's library. The book was entitled Statistics, Media, and Organizations of Jewry in the United States and Canada. Hitler's personal copy of the book was obtained by Library and Archives Canada in 2018 and was restored, digitized and made available to the public in 2019. However, the text of the book had already been available online from the Deutsche Nationale Bibliothek.

There is a Heinz Kloss fonds at Library and Archives Canada. The archival reference number is R11623.

Selected works
 
  (two volumes)

References

Further reading
 
 
 
 
 

1904 births
1987 deaths
People from Halle (Saale)
Linguists from Germany
People from the Province of Saxony
Martin Luther University of Halle-Wittenberg alumni
Humboldt University of Berlin alumni
20th-century linguists